The 2002–03 Football Conference season was the 24th season of the Football Conference.

Overview
This season the number of teams promoted to the Football League Division Three was increased from one to two, and play-offs were introduced to determine the second team to be promoted, along with the Conference champions. The bottom three, as usual, were relegated to either the Northern Premier League, the Southern Premier League or the Isthmian League.

Yeovil Town clinched the league title and won promotion to the Football League Division Three.

Doncaster Rovers also earned promotion to Division Three following their 3–2 play-off win over Dagenham & Redbridge, during extra time with a sudden death goal in the 110th minute.

The regular season began on 17 August 2002, and ended on 26 April 2003.

Changes since the previous season
 Burton Albion (promoted 2001–02)
 Gravesend & Northfleet (promoted 2001–02)
 Halifax Town (relegated from the Football League 2001–02)
 Kettering Town (promoted 2001–02)

Final league table

Locations

Results

Play-offs

The Conference National play-offs determine the second team that will be promoted to the Football League Division Three. The teams placed second through fifth qualify for the play-offs. The semi-finals are played in a two-leg, home and away format, while the final is played as one leg, and this season it was held on 10 May 2003 at Britannia Stadium, Stoke, before a crowd of 13,092.

Source:

Top scorers in order of league goals

 Footballtransfers.co.uk contains information on many players on whom there is not yet an article in Wikipedia.

Source:

References

External links
 Official Football Conference Website

 
5
National League (English football) seasons
English